Poletto is a surname of Italian origin. Notable people with the surname include:

Lucas Poletto (footballer, born 1994), Argentine midfielder or forward
Lucas Poletto (footballer, born 1995), Brazilian forward
Severino Poletto (born 1933), Italian Roman Catholic cardinal

References

Surnames of Italian origin